Rus' chronicle or Russian chronicle or Rus' letopis is the main type of Rus' historical literature. Chronicles were composed from 11th to 18th centuries. Chronicles were one of the leading genres of Old Rus' literature.

Chronicles were the main form of historical narrative until the middle of the 16th century, the time of Ivan the Terrible, when they gave primacy to another historiographical genre – chronographs.

Copies
Rus' chronicles survive in some hundreds copies (codices). Some chronicles are known in multiple versions, but others are known from only a single copy. Individual chronicles were revised, shortened or added to with entries on the events of the last year or even decades.

Сharacteristic
The chroniclers (singular letopisets) were mainly churchmen. Rus' chronicles were composed in monasteries, at the princely (see: knyaz) courts (later at the courts of the tsars of Moscow and kings of Galicia-Volhynia) and in the offices of Metropolitans. Individual chronicles often contradicted each other. Chronicles typically consisted of collections of short factual entries for the preceding year, often including speeches and dialogues between princes.  In some instances the chronicler would provide an extended narrative on the most significant events of Rus' history, often embellished with literary phrases, including standard speech formulas, epithets, rhetorical figures and others.

Aleksey Shakhmatov was the foremost expert in textology of Rus' chronicles.

In recent studies much of the chronicles have become viewed as collections of annual records, produced in certain state or church offices – as are West European annals. For example, the hypothetical "Novgorod Archbishop Chronicle" is believed to have been prepared at the office of Novgorod Archdiocese from 12th to 14th centuries and was the main basis of the Novgorod First Chronicle of the 15th century.

Sources
Sources for the oldest chronicles include Byzantine and South Slavic texts on sacred history and other subjects, the Chronicle of George Hamartolos on the Generations of Noah (in the Primary Chronicle), legends, legal documents such as the Rus'–Byzantine Treaties (in the Primary Chronicle) and the short redaction of Russkaya Pravda (in the Novgorod First Chronicle), historical records and others.

Genealogy

The Primary Chronicle of the beginning of the 12th century is the oldest surviving Rus' chronicle, narrating the earliest history of Kievan Rus'. However Aleksey Shakhmatov paid attention to the abundance of entries about the 11th century Novgorod, which are also present in the Novgorod First Chronicle (of the 15th century), but absent in the Primary Chronicle. This and some others textual facts were a base for Shakhmatov's theory that the beginning of Novgorod First Chronicle includes text that is older than that in the Primary Chronicle. The scholar named it "Primary Svod" (Collection) and dated it to the end of the 11th century. This svod was also a basis for the Primary Chronicle. If two or more chronicles coincide with each other up to a certain year, then either one chronicle is copied from another (more rarely) or these chronicles had a common source, an older svod. Shakhmatov discovered and developed a method of study on the chronicle (svod) genealogy. Based on textual analysis, Shakhmatov built extensive genealogy of the old Rus' chronicles. He connected most of these chronicles and created a genealogy table, in which the extant chronicles of the 14–17th centuries went back not only to the "Primary Svod", but also to earlier hypothetical  of the 11th century and even to historical records of the end of the 10th century. Shakhmatov's method and theories became a mainstay in Rus' chronicle studies.

History
Rus' chronicles were systematically prepared from the middle of the 11th century. There were two centers of chronicle preparation in this early period: Kiev (the capital of early Rus') and Novgorod. The Primary Chronicle of the beginning of the 12th century was a combination of Kievan and Novgorodian chronicle records, as well as the Novgorod First Chronicle. The Primary Chronicle survives in the Laurentian and Hypatian codices. Chronicles of Kievan Rus' princedoms of the 12–13th centuries survive in the Hypatian Chronicle which includes the hypothetical Kievan Chronicle, a continuation of the Primary Chronicle and covered events from 1118 to 1200, and the Galician–Volhynian Chronicle which covered events in Galicia and Volhynia from 1201 to 1292. Chronicles of Rostov, Vladimir and Pereyaslavl of Suzdal of the end of 12th – early 13th century better remained in the Laurentian, Radziwill chronicles (codices) and Chronicle of Pereyaslavl of Suzdal.

Hypatian Chronicle of the end of the 13th – early 14th centuries is an All-Rus' svod in south redaction (presumably). It survives in сopies from the 15–18th centuries. Laurentian Chronicle of the 14th century is a svod from North-East Rus' (Vladimir-Suzdal). One copy of 1377.

"Tverian svod" of 1375 reflected in the Rogozhskiy Chronicle and Tverian Collection of the 16th century. Chronicle svod, related to Cyprian, Metropolitan of Moscow, was continued up to 1408 and survived in Troitskaya ("Trinity") Chronicle, which burnt in the Fire of Moscow of 1812. It was reconstructed by Mikhail Prisyolkov. This "Tverian svod" reflected in the Simeon and Rogozhskiy chronicles. "Novgorodsko-Sofiysky Svod" of the 1430s (or "Svod of 1448" according to Shakhmatov) was compiled at the office of Moscow Metropolitan and united All-Rus' and Novgorodian chronicles. The svod was preserved in the Sofia First and Novgorod Fourth chronicles.

First known Moscow grand princely chronicles appeared at the middle of the 15th century. "Chronicle Svod of 1472" reflected in the Vologda–Perm and Nicanor chronicles. Basis of "Svod of 1472" was "Novgorodsko-Sofiysky Svod", edited by Moscow grand princely chroniclers, who brought censorship, excluded in particular the mentions of Novgorodian liberty, because Novgorod State was joint to Moscow Grand Princedom. In the end of the 1470s, "Novgorodsko-Sofiysky Svod", the svod similar to Troitskaya Chronicle and other sources was compiled together. This compilation was censored even more than the "Svod of 1472". The "Compilation of the 1470s" reflected in "Moscow Grand Princely Svod of 1479", surviving in copy of the 18th century, and in its later redaction was continued up to 1492. This "Svod of 1479" underlaid all of official chronicles of the end of the 15th – 16th centuries. The compilation of the 1470s also reflected in the first part of Yermolin Chronicle. The "Svod of Kirillo-Belozersky Monastery" contained text, independent of Moscow Grand Princedom. This svod reflected in the second part of Yermolin Chronicle and in so-called Abridged Chronicle Svods of the end of the 15th century. "Rostov Archbishop Svod" of the 1480s reflected in Typographical Chronicle. Another "Chronicle Svod of 1480s", made in unofficial church sphere, reflected in the "Svod of 1518", which in turn reflected in the Sofia Second Chronicle and Lvov Chronicle. Ioasaf Chronicle was made at the end of the 1520s at the office of Moscow Metropolitan. It covered events of 1437–1520. In the same years, the first redaction of the Nikon Chronicle was compiled using the Ioasaf Chronicle as its immediate source. Nikon Chronicle was the largest Rus' chronicle. Voskresenskaya ("Resurrection") Chronicle was another extensive chronicle created between 1542–1544. In late 1550s, during the reign of Ivan the Terrible, initial redaction of the Nikon Chronicle was united with passages from Voskresenskaya Chronicle and the Chronicle of the Beginning of Tsardom – chronicle of events of 1533–1552, i.e. the beginning of Ivan's reign. In 1568—1576, also during the reign of Ivan the Terrible, the multivolume Illustrated Chronicle Svod was created. This  was the last All-Rus' chronicle, as they were replaced by another form of historiographical texts – chronographs. Russian chronicles of the 17–18th centuries were local, provincial texts, like Siberian Chronicles of the late 16th – 18th centuries.

Development of Rus' chronicles were Lithuanian Chronicles of the 15–16th centuries and  Ukrainian Chronicles of the 17–18th centuries.

List of Rus' chronicles 

 Novgorodsko-Sofiysky Svod ( 1430s; hypothetical common source of the Novgorod Fourth Chronicle and the Sofia First Chronicle)
 Novgorod Fourth Chronicle ("N4"; 15th century)
 Sofia First Chronicle ("S1"; 15th century)
 Trinity Chronicle ("TL"; early 15th century)
 Simeon's Chronicle ("Sim."; end of 15th century)
 Sofia Second Chronicle (16th century)
 Novgorod Second Chronicle ("N2"; 16th century)
 Nikon Chronicle (mid-16th-century compilation)
 Kazan Chronicle or Kazan History (written  1560–1565, first printed in 1790)
 Illustrated Chronicle of Ivan the Terrible or Tsar Book ( 1570)
 Tver Chronicle ("Tver"; 16th century, includes material from  1400)
 Vladimir Chronicler (Vladimirskiy letopisets; "Vlad."; 16th century)
 Ioachim Chronicle (17th-century compilation)
 Ukrainian Chronicles: (17th–18th-century grouping)
 Lviv Chronicle (17th century)
 Hustyn Chronicle (17th century)
  (17th century)
  (17th century)
  (17th-century collection)
  (17th–18th-century grouping)
 
  by 
  by Samiilo Velychko
 Siberian Chronicles (late-16th–18th century grouping), including:
 Stroganov Chronicle
 Kungur Chronicle
 Yesipov Chronicle
 Remezov Chronicle
 Pskov Third Chronicle
 Complete Collection of Russian Chronicles (1841 compilation of some Rus' chronicles)

See also

 Nestor the Chronicler
 Kormchaia
 Merilo Pravednoye
 Russkaya Pravda
 De moribus tartarorum, lituanorum et moscorum
 Freising manuscripts

References

Some editions
 Complete Collection of Russian Chronicles: . — СПб.; М, 1843; М., 1989. — Т. 1—38.
 Новгородская первая летопись старшего и младшего изводов. — М.; Л., 1950.
 Псковские летописи.— М.; Л., 1941—1955. — Вып. 1—2.
 Рассказы русских летописей XII—XIV вв. / Перевод и пояснения Т.Н. Михельсон. — М., 1968; 2-е изд. — М., 1973.
 Рассказы русских летописей XV—XVII вв. / Перевод и пояснения Т.Н. Михельсон — М., 1976,
 Севернорусский летописный свод 1472 года / Подг. текста и комм Я.С. Лурье; Перевод В.В. Колесова // Памятники литературы Древней Руси: Вторая половина XV века. — М., 1982. — С. 410—443, 638—655.
 The Rus' Primary Chronicle, Laurentian Text. Translated and edited by Samuel Hazzard Cross and Olgerd P. Sherbowitz-Wetzor. Cambridge, MA: The Mediaeval Academy of America, 1953.
 [https://web.archive.org/web/20081207013842/http://www.uoregon.edu/~kimball/chronicle.htm Excerpts of Primary Chronicle, including founding of Novgorod by Rus', Attacks on Byzantines, and Conversion of Vladimir. Also mentions several Slavic tribes by name.
 A collation of Primary Chronicle by Donald Ostrowski in Cyrillic is available at https://web.archive.org/web/20050309022812/http://hudce7.harvard.edu/~ostrowski/pvl/ together with an erudite and lengthy introduction in English. This is an interlinear collation including the five main manuscript witnesses, as well as a new paradosis, or reconstruction of the original.
 The Chronicle of Novgorod 1016-1471.  Intr. C. Raymond Beazley, A. A. Shakhmatov (London, 1914).

Bibliography

 Likhachov, Dimitry Русские летописи и их культурно-историческое значение. — М.; Л., 1947.
 Nasonov Насонов А.Н. История русского летописания XI — начала XVIII века. — М., 1969
 
 
 Priselkov Приселков М.Д. История русского летописания XI—XV вв. — Л., 1940.
 Priselkov Приселков М.Д. Троицкая летопись: Реконструкция текста. – 2-е изд. – СПб.: Наука, 2002. – 512, [2] с.
 Aleksey Shakhmatov. Investigation on the Oldest Rus' Chronicle Svods. — Saint Petersburg: Printing-House of M.A. Aleksandrov, 1908. — XX, 686 p. — Reprint from Chronicle of Work of Imperial Archaeographic Commission. — Vol. 20..
 Aleksey Shakhmatov. Review of Rus' Chronicle Svods of 14th—16th Century. Moscow / ed. by A.S. Orlov, Boris Grekov; Academy of Sciences of USSR, Institute of Literature. — Moscow, Leningrad: Publisher of Academy of Sciences of USSR, 1938. — 372 p..
 Suhomlinov Сухомлинов М.И. О древней русской летописи как памятнике литературном. — СПб., 1856.
 Дмитриева Р.П. Библиография русского летописания. — М.; Л., 1962
 Творогов О.В. Сюжетное повествование в летописях XI—XIII вв. / Истоки русской беллетристики: Возникновение сюжетного повествования в древнерусской литературы. — Л.: Наука, 1970. — С. 31—66.
 Лурье Я.С. К изучению летописного жанра // Труды Отдела древнерусской литературы. — 1972. — Т. 27. — С. 76—93.
 Лурье Я.С. Общерусские летописи XIV—XV вв. — Л., 1976.
 Корецкий В.И. История русского летописания второй половины XVI — начала XVII века. — М., 1986.
 Словарь книжников и книжности Древней Руси / АН СССР. ИРЛИ; Отв. ред. Д.С. Лихачев. — Л.: Наука, 1987. — Вып. 1 (XI – первая половина XIV в.). — С. 234—251; Л.: Наука, 1989. — Вып. 2, ч. 2. — С. 17—18, 20—69.
 Лурье Я.С. Две истории Руси XV века. — СПб., 1994.
 Literature of Old Rusʹ. Biographical and Bibliographical Dictionary / ed. by Oleg Tvorogov. - Moscow: Prosvescheniye ("Enlightenment"), 1996..
 Бобров А.Г. Новгородские летописи XV века. — СПб.: Дмитрий Буланин, 2000. — 287 с.
 Гиппиус А.А. К истории сложения текста Новгородской первой летописи // Новгородский исторический сборник. — СПб., 1997. — Вып. 6 (16) / Рос. акад. наук, Институт рос. истории, С.-Петербургский филиал; отв. ред. В.Л. Янин. — C. 3–72.
 Гиппиус А.А. К характеристике новгородского владычного летописания XII–XIV вв. // Великий Новгород в истории средневековой Европы: К 70-летию В.Л. Янина. — М.: Русские словари, 1999. — С. 345–364.
 Гимон Т.В. События XI – начала XII в. в новгородских летописях и перечнях // Древнейшие государства Восточной Европы: 2010 год: Предпосылки и пути образования Древнерусского государства / отв. ред. серии Е.А. Мельникова. Институт всеобщей истории РАН. — М.: Рус. Фонд Содействия Образ. и Науке, 2012. — С. 584–706.
 Сергеев В.И. Сибирские летописи // Жуков Е.М. Советская историческая энциклопедия: В 16 т. - М.: Государственное научное издательство «Советская энциклопедия», 1961-1976.

East Slavic manuscripts
East Slavic chronicles
Old Church Slavonic literature
Novgorod Republic
Cyrillic manuscripts
History of Russia